Mikhailo Parashchuk (16 November 1878 – 24 December 1963) was a Ukrainian sculptor who was active in Bulgaria from 1921 to his death.

Parashchuk was born in Varvaryntsi in Ternopil Oblast (then in Galicia, Austria-Hungary, today in Ukraine). He enrolled in the Academy of Fine Arts Vienna, but graduated from the Julien Academy in Paris, France in 1910; in France, he was reportedly a student of Auguste Rodin. Before his graduation, Parashchuk worked in Lviv on monuments to noted Ukrainian writers.

As a lecturer at the Academy of Fine Arts Munich, he was introduced to several Bulgarian artists and actors. During World War I, Parashchuk was a member of the Red Cross and organized an art workshop for Russian Army prisoners of war.

Parashchuk arrived in Sofia in 1921 as an International Red Cross volunteer. In the Bulgarian capital, Parashchuk was a very popular sculptor who contributed to the decoration of many major public buildings. Projects that Parashchuk executed include the ornamental frames of the Sofia Court House gates, the Bulgarian National Bank lion decorations and zodiac clock, history-related reliefs in the Rakovski Defence and Staff College, the facade decoration of the SS. Cyril and Methodius National Library, the interior of the Ministry of War and the geometric decoration of the Sofia University rectorate.

Outside the capital, Parashchuk created the sculptural decoration of buildings in Pernik, Velingrad, Kardzhali, Varna, Provadia and Sapareva Banya, as well as the Giurgiu-Rousse Friendship Bridge. Besides working in building decoration, Parashchuk was also engaged in sculpting busts and bas-reliefs of noted Bulgarians, including Peyo Yavorov, Gotse Delchev, Stefan Karadzha, Dimitar Blagoev, Hristo Botev and Aleko Konstantinov.

Despite his popularity, Parashchuk was twice expelled from the Union of Bulgarian Artists in the 1940s and 1950s because he was accused of being a fascist, western spy or White Russian, although before World War II he was slandered as a "Bolshevik agent" and "Comintern member". It was not until 1963 that he was readmitted to the union after his second expulsion. Parashchuk was one of the leaders of the Ukrainian emigrants in Bulgaria: he was among the founders of the Ukrainian–Bulgarian Association and the Hromada Ukrainian cultural and educational associations.

Mikhaylo Parashchuk was married to Tsvetana Pekareva, the daughter of prominent agrarian politician and early BANU activist Yurdan Pekarev. Reports disagree on his place of death, with some claiming he died in Sofia and others in Karlovo, though the most detailed biographies insist he died in Banya near Karlovo. Parashchuk was buried in Sofia and his grave is decorated by a bust of the sculptor and a lion created by noted Bulgarian sculptor Vezhdi Rashidov.

References

1878 births
1963 deaths
Ukrainian sculptors
Ambassadors of Ukraine to Estonia
People from Ternopil Oblast
People from the Kingdom of Galicia and Lodomeria
Ukrainian Austro-Hungarians
Bulgarian sculptors
Bulgarian people of Ukrainian descent
Academic staff of the Academy of Fine Arts, Munich
Academy of Fine Arts Vienna alumni
Burials at Central Sofia Cemetery
20th-century sculptors
20th-century Bulgarian artists
Ukrainian male sculptors
Austro-Hungarian emigrants to Bulgaria